Dean Scott Lewington (born 18 May 1984) is an English professional footballer and coach who plays as a left-back, as well as a centre-back for  club Milton Keynes Dons, where he is club captain. He has held coaching roles at the club, and briefly became interim head coach of the club in August 2021.

Lewington is Milton Keynes Dons' longest-serving player, and  holds the most career league appearances of any active EFL player at one club. On that date, Lewington achieved his 700th career League appearance against Portsmouth at Stadium MK, Joining fellow left sided defenders Roy Sproson (760), Jimmy Dickinson, (764), and John Trollope (770) as the only players in football league history to have achieved 700 league appearances for a single league club.

Club career

Wimbledon
Born in Kingston upon Thames, London, Lewington made his Wimbledon first team debut on 5 April 2003, coming on as a last-minute substitute for Alex Tapp in a 4–2 First Division defeat to Sheffield Wednesday at Hillsborough, his only appearance of the season.

On 1 November 2003, he made his first start, in a 2–1 win over Bradford City at the National Hockey Stadium, their first victory in Milton Keynes. He scored his first goal on 26 December in a 3–0 win away to Reading at the Madejski Stadium, heading Adam Nowland's cross for the second of the game. Lewington was sent off for violent conduct near the end of the team's 0–3 home defeat to Coventry City on 21 February 2004. At the end of the season, Wimbledon were relegated.

Milton Keynes Dons

Having moved to Milton Keynes in 2003, Wimbledon were relaunched in 2004 as Milton Keynes Dons, in the newly renamed League One. Lewington almost moved to Huddersfield Town in 2005 in an exchange deal involving Pawel Abbott, however Abbott chose to stay at Huddersfield thus ending their interest. , Lewington is the only former Wimbledon player at Milton Keynes Dons.

He received the MK Dons captaincy after the departure of Keith Andrews to Blackburn Rovers in August 2008. On 21 March 2011, Lewington led his team to a 1–0 victory over promotion rivals Peterborough United. The Dons reached the play-offs but were defeated by Peterborough. On 2 December 2012, Lewington captained his side against AFC Wimbledon in their highly publicised first meeting. On 12 January 2013, Lewington made his 400th league appearance for Milton Keynes Dons against Bury.

Lewington scored his only goal of the 2013–14 League One season in the last minute of a 3–2 victory over Stevenage at Broadhall Way. The 2–2 draw with Rotherham United at the New York Stadium on 26 April 2014 saw Lewington make his 500th appearance for Milton Keynes Dons in all competitions. To celebrate his 500th appearance for the club, supporters of Milton Keynes Dons got together for the last home game of the season against Leyton Orient, and wore as much orange as possible (due to Lewington's hair colour). This campaign was dubbed "Orange4Lewie" and gained some publicity from Twitter, Facebook and other social media.

On 3 May 2015, Lewington scored twice and assisted two further goals as the Dons defeated Yeovil Town 5–1 on the final day of the season to earn their first promotion to the Championship. On 20 May 2014, Milton Keynes Dons announced a testimonial match against Nottingham Forest would be played in honour of Lewington's ten years of service for the club. The match was played on 27 July 2014 at stadium:mk although 4,121 attended the game, of whom 1,286 were from Nottingham Forest. At the time of his testimonial, Lewington had amassed over 500 appearances in league and cup competitions for Milton Keynes Dons.

Between January and May 2018 Lewington temporarily worked in a player-coach role for the club under then manager Dan Micciche. Lewington achieved his 600th league appearance and 700th appearance in all competitions for the club in January 2019 in consecutive games against Crewe Alexandra and Grimsby Town. During the 2018–19 season he played a key role in the club's automatic promotion from League Two, playing every league game during the campaign and achieving his third automatic promotion with the club.

Lewington signed a further contract extension with the club in July 2020, at which point he was the longest-serving player for a single club in the Football League. On 18 March 2021 - on the verge of his 800th appearance for the club - his contract was extended once again taking him into his 18th season with the MK Dons. On 29 April 2021, Lewington's 800th appearance was recognised as the Moment of the Season at the 2021 EFL Awards. He was named Milton Keynes Dons Player of the Year for the 2020–21 season on 7 May 2021.

On 3 August 2021, just four days before the beginning of the 2021–22 season, MK Dons announced Lewington would take over as interim caretaker manager following the departure of Russell Martin, whilst the club sought a permanent replacement. On 11 September 2021, Lewington made his 700th league appearance for the club in a 1–0 victory over Portsmouth. On 3 May 2022, Dean Lewington signed a new contract until 2023, taking him into his 19th season with the club.

Personal life
He is the son of former England assistant manager Ray Lewington. Lewington and his longtime partner Gemma welcomed their first daughter Willow in the Summer of 2017. Two years later, the couple had their second daughter named Lottie on 29 February 2020.

Career statistics

Club

Managerial record

Honours
Milton Keynes Dons
League One runner-up: 2014–15
League Two: 2007–08; third-place promotion: 2018–19
Football League Trophy: 2007–08

Individual
PFA Team of the Year: 2007–08 League Two, 2008–09 League One
Milton Keynes Dons Player of the Decade
Milton Keynes Dons Player of the Year: 2020–21
EFL Moment of the Season: 2021
League One Player of the Month: November 2008

References

External links
Dean Lewington player profile at mkdons.com

1984 births
Living people
Footballers from Kingston upon Thames
English footballers
Association football defenders
Wimbledon F.C. players
Milton Keynes Dons F.C. players
English Football League players